The Daulatpur–Saturia tornado occurred in Manikganj District, Bangladesh on April 26, 1989. It was the deadliest tornado in Bangladesh's history. There is great uncertainty about the death toll, but estimates indicate that it was devastating and that it killed approximately 1,300 people, which would make it the deadliest tornado in history. The tornado affected the cities of Daulatpur and Saturia the most, moving east through Daulatpur and eventually northeast into Saturia. Previously, the area that the tornado hit had been in a state of drought for six months.

Background
The Ganges Basin, comprising the entirety of Bangladesh, is frequented by severe weather. Such storms that are capable of producing tornadoes in this region are most common during the pre- and post-monsoon months. An average of six tornadoes occur annually in Bangladesh, with peak activity in April. The pre-monsoon months (March to May) display the most favorable conditions for severe weather. During this time, convective available potential energy—an indicator of atmospheric instability whereby higher values denote a greater likelihood of thunderstorms—and wind shear are conducive to the development of rotating thunderstorms. Instability is greatest over West Bengal, India, and adjacent areas of Bangladesh. Storms frequently develop in this region and travel southeast across the country. These storms are locally referred to as norwesters or Kalbaishakhi.

Event and aftermath
On April 25, 1989, a 1000 mbar (hPa; 29.53 inHg) area of low pressure propagated over Bihar and West Bengal, India, with a trough extending east across Bangladesh and into Manipur, India. The system remained largely stationary throughout the day into April 26. On that day, another low approached from Madhya Pradesh, and in conjunction with a ridge over China, the pressure gradient became tighter across Bangladesh. Warm, moist air flowed northeast from the Bay of Bengal while cool, dry air flowed south from the Himalayas. In the upper-levels of the atmosphere above the low, strong westerly winds from the jet stream created ample wind shear, a key factor in the development of supercell thunderstorms capable of producing tornadoes. An established dry line over western Bangladesh served as a focal point for thunderstorm development. By 12:00 UTC, all the aforementioned factors served to produce severe thunderstorms across the country.

Around 12:30 UTC, a tornado touched down near Daulatpur in the Manikganj District and traveled east, soon striking Saturia. It caused tremendous damage across a  area covering three upazilas, with Saturia being hardest-hit. A World Meteorological Organization news letter noted the tornado as F3.5 on the Fujita Scale. However, the stated wind estimate of  would rank it as an F4.

It killed roughly 1,300 people and injured 12,000. Damage was extensive, as countless trees were uprooted and every home within a six square kilometer area of the tornado's path was completely destroyed. An article in the Bangladesh Observer stated, "The devastation was so complete, that barring some skeletons of trees, there were no signs of standing infrastructures". Approximately 80,000 people were left homeless. A second tornado struck the Narsingdi District, killing 5 people and injuring 500 others.

See also 

 List of tornadoes and tornado outbreaks
 List of Asian tornadoes and tornado outbreaks
 Tri-State Tornado – The deadliest tornado recorded in the United States
 1996 Bangladesh tornado
 2013 Brahmanbaria tornado

References

External links
 Bangladesh and East India tornado prediction site

Tornadoes in Bangladesh
Tornadoes of 1989
1989 in Bangladesh
April 1989 events in Asia
1989 disasters in Asia